The  is a full-size luxury sedan (E-segment in Europe) serving as the flagship model of Lexus, the luxury division of Toyota. For the first four generations, all LS models featured V8 engines and were predominantly rear-wheel-drive. In the fourth generation, Lexus offered all-wheel-drive, hybrid, and long-wheelbase variants. The fifth generation changed to using a V6 engine with no V8 option, and only one length was offered.

As the first model developed by Lexus, the LS 400 debuted in January 1989 with the second generation debuting in November 1994. The LS 430 debuted in January 2000 and the LS 460/LS 460 L series in 2006. In 2006 (for the 2007 model year), the fourth generation LS 460 debuted the first production eight-speed automatic transmission and an automatic parking system. In 2007, V8 hybrid powertrains were introduced on the LS 600h/LS 600h L sedans.

Development of the LS began in 1983 as the F1 project, the code name for a secret flagship sedan. At the time, Toyota's two existing flagship models were the Crown and Century models - both of which catered exclusively for the Japanese market and had little global appeal that could compete with international luxury brands such as Mercedes-Benz, BMW and Jaguar. The resulting sedan followed an extended five-year design process at a cost of over US$1 billion, and premiered with a new V8 engine and numerous luxury features. The Lexus LS was intended from its inception for export markets, and the Lexus division was formed to market and service the vehicle internationally. The original LS 400 debuted to strong sales, and was largely responsible for the successful launch of the Lexus marque.

Since the start of production, each generation of the Lexus LS has been manufactured in the Japanese city of Tahara, Aichi. The name "LS" stands for "Luxury Sedan", although some Lexus importers have preferred to define it as "Luxury Saloon". The name "Celsior" is taken from Latin word "celsus", meaning "lofty" or "elevated".

First generation (XF10; 1989)

1989–1992 
In August 1983, Toyota chairman Eiji Toyoda initiated the F1 project ("Flagship" and "No. 1" vehicle; alternatively called the "Circle-F" project), as a clandestine effort aimed at producing a world-class luxury sedan for international markets. The F1 development effort did not have a specific budget or time constraints, and the resulting vehicle did not use existing Toyota platforms or parts. Instead, chief engineer Ichiro Suzuki sought to develop an all-new design, aiming to surpass rival American and European flagship sedans in specific target areas, including aerodynamics, cabin quietness, overall top speed, and fuel efficiency. During development, the 60 designers with 1,400 engineers in 24 teams, 2,300 technicians and over 200 support workers built approximately 450 flagship prototypes and 900 engine prototypes. The teams logged  of testing on locations ranging from winter Europe roadways, to deserts in Arizona, Australia, or Saudi Arabia, to U.S. highways and wilderness areas.

In May 1985, designers started work on the F1 project. In late 1985, designers presented the first exterior study models to F1 management, featuring a sports car-like design with a low-slung hood and narrow front profile. By 1986, the sedan used a three-box design with an upright stance, more prominent grille, and a two-tone body. Extensive modeling and wind tunnel tests resulted in a low drag coefficient for a conventional production vehicle of the time (Cd 0.29). For the passenger cabin, the materials-selection tests evaluated 24 different kinds of wood and multiple types of leather for two years before settling on specific trim combinations. By 1986, the Lexus marque was created to support the launch of the flagship sedan, and the vehicle became known as the Lexus LS. Following eight design reviews, subsequent revisions, concept approval in February 1987, and over US$1 billion in development expenses, the final design for the production Lexus LS 400 (chassis code UCF10) was frozen in May 1987 with design patents filed on 20 February 1987 and 13 May 1987.

In January 1989, the LS 400 made its debut as a 1990 model at the North American International Auto Show, in Detroit, Michigan. Production began on 15 May 1989, with the first shipments leaving Japanese ports in late June 1989. The first cars were available in August 1989 and U.S. sales officially began on 1 September 1989, followed by limited exports to Australia, Canada, and the United Kingdom starting in 1990. The chassis used an independent, high-mount upper arm double-wishbone suspension setup with twin tube shock absorbers, and a passive air suspension system was optional. At its introduction in 1989, it won the Car of the Year Japan award.

The LS 400 was among the first luxury sedans to feature an automatic tilt-and-telescoping steering wheel with SRS airbag, power adjustable shoulder seat belts, and an electrochromic rear-view mirror. The five-passenger cabin included California walnut and leather trim, power-adjustable seats, and soft-touch controls. A back-lit electro-luminescent gauge cluster featured a holographic visual effect, with indicator lights projected onto the instrument panel. The memory system stored the driver's seat, side mirror, steering wheel, and seat belt positions. Available luxury options included a Nakamichi premium sound system and an integrated cellular telephone with hands-free capabilities. The LS 400 further contained some 300 technological innovations to aid smooth operation and silence, including fluid-damped cabin fixtures, vibration-insulating rubber mounts, airflow fairings, and sandwich steel body panels.

In Japan, the launch of Lexus was complicated by Toyota's existing four domestic dealership networks at the time of its introduction. The Toyota Crown and Toyota Century were exclusive to Toyota Store locations. During the LS 400's development, local dealers' requests for a Japanese domestic market version had grown, and a right-hand-drive Toyota Celsior-badged version was introduced shortly after the LS 400's U.S. debut, and introduced on 9 October 1989 and only available at Toyopet Store locations. The Celsior, named after the Latin word for "supreme", was largely identical to the LS. Models came in either basic "A", a "B" model with uprated suspension, or fully equipped "C" trim specifications. The Crown and the Crown Majesta, which appeared later in 1991, were only available at Toyota Store locations which carried Japan-only Toyota luxury models, like the Century. Ownership costs for Japanese drivers were and are expensive due to Japanese Government dimension regulations and annual road tax obligations. The Celsior introduced two world firsts: high-performance twin-tube shock absorbers and an air suspension combined with an upgraded version of Toyota's semi-active Toyota Electronic Modulated Suspension, called Piezo TEMS. This was ahead of its time: Mercedes-Benz first introduced a similar electronically controlled air suspension on the 1999 Mercedes-Benz S-Class (W220) (Airmatic).

Adding incentive for early U.S. sales was a base price of US$35,000, which undercut competitors by thousands of dollars and brought accusations of selling below cost from rival BMW. Being a flagship luxury sedan in the full-size segment, the relatively low starting MSRP was actually targeted to be at $25,000 during initial stages of development. However, the depreciation of the Yen vs. the Dollar resulted in a climb to $35,000. Lexus division general manager Dave Illingworth admitted in an interview with Automotive News that many in product planning were concerned about the price hike and the potential effect it could have on sales success. Part of the concern was due to the fact that the Lexus nameplate lacked the heritage and brand recognition of German rivals such as Mercedes-Benz. Similarly, luxury cars competing in a class slightly below that of the BMW 7-Series and Mercedes S-Class averaged in the $25000 range. However, once the LS400 was released, sales figures were very positive, as the vehicle was nearly universally praised for its high standards and levels of specification. Lexus' parent company Toyota had already established a strong reputation of reliability and quality among economy cars, and the Cressida sedan gave the American market some evidence that Toyota was capable of building competent, larger luxury flagships with equivalent reliability.

In December 1989, shortly after the LS 400's launch, Lexus ordered a voluntary recall of the 8,000 vehicles sold so far, based upon two customer complaints over defective wiring and an overheated brake light. All vehicles were serviced within 20 days, and the incident helped establish Lexus' customer service reputation. By 1990, U.S. sales of the LS 400 had surpassed those of competing Mercedes-Benz, BMW, and Jaguar models. Production of the first-generation LS 400 totaled over 165,000 units. The LS 400 made Consumer Reports 2007 list of recommended vehicles that regularly last  or more, with proper maintenance.

1992–1994 

Debuting in September 1992 as a 1993 model, the refreshed LS 400 (designed through 1991) was introduced with more than 50 changes, largely in response to customer and dealer requests. The vehicle received larger disc brakes, wheels, and tires, and adjustments were made to the suspension and power steering systems to improve handling. Stylistic changes included additional body side moldings and a revised grille, along with a greater selection of colors. For the interior, a standard passenger front airbag (making this vehicle the first Toyota-built series production car available with passenger front airbag), external temperature gauge, digital odometer, seat belt pretensioners, and chlorofluorocarbon-free refrigerant were added. In 1992, the Celsior introduced the world's first GPS navigation system with voice instructions, supplied by Aisin. By 1994, the LS 400's U.S. base price exceeded , a figure that had steadily risen since the vehicle's introduction. Customer demand for the vehicle and shifts in foreign exchange rates contributed to the increase in price. The growing popularity of the LS internationally was an asset to Toyota, as Japan had entered into an economic recession in 1991, that later became what was called the collapse of the Japanese asset price bubble or "bubble economy".

A considerable point is that in the years after the LS400/Celsoir went out of production in 1994, the car has continued to influence the entire world of manufacturing. The Toyota Production System largely infiltrated American manufacturing around the time MIT's IMVP academic group coined lean manufacturing, as MBA John Krafcik used his Lexus-influenced knowledge learned to model Genesis, as Hyundai-Kia themselves used TPS to become benchmarks in modern day. Within Toyota's own development efforts, the LS400's innovative advancements spread down through the company line-up. Through leveraging sister platforms, Toyota also used the economic conditions of currency differentials to trickle down the high standards set by the LS400. This type of reputation-setting efforts was monumental and not very profitable for Toyota, but they saw it as a way to gain a sterling reputation for quality and reliability. Afterwards Toyota planners would look for ways to reduce costs in the lower models (in their next generations). For example, the MX83 Toyota Cressida was a first glimpse at the LS400 and SXV10 Camry to come following in 1992. The MX83 was a clear step up from the 2nd generation V20 Camry. Additionally, Toyota saw it as an educational experience of refinement for engineering researchers in the United States market. It was large (notably more so than V20 Camry), and was designed to be a proper mid-size American car. Toyota used the MX83 as a hollow shell to build the LS400 interior concept into, until that cabin was transferred to a larger, more bubble type body shell. Extensive audio testing with Nakamichi systems was done by using LS400 prototype interiors in Cressida bodies. As the LS400 was then refined, Toyota went through extraordinary efforts to refine the standards of the MX83 even slightly further, as fit and finish became the best in the industry. This level of fit and finish trickled down to the 1992 XV10 Toyota Camry/Lexus ES300 shared platform. The 1992 Camry shocked the industry as it was only a non-luxury midsize family sedan (in base non-XLE trims at least). However, the complex flushed window stamping and flowing one piece roof were modelled from new processes learned by Toyota making the LS400, as were the triple sealing framed doors. To accomplish this, the doors use indented rubber gaskets to seal the door in a fashion similar to that used by Tupperware food containers. There were no other mid-size sedans built to such fit and finish standards, except the high-end German BMW 5-series and Mercedes-Benz E-class cars. This point was made by Chris Goffey during BBC's 1991 Motorfair Top Gear coverage.

Principles such as Heijunka boards, andon pull cords and Gemba walking have become embedded in aerospace engineering production at Boeing and its subsidiaries. The Federal Aviation Administration lists the FV2400-2TC (a 1UZ-FE derivative) as aviation certified. Intel modelled the "Internet of Things" on what was learned from Toyota's LS 400 quality standards.

Production of the first-generation LS ended in September 1994 to make way for production of the second-generation model in October.

Second generation (XF20; 1994)

1994–1997 
The second-generation Lexus LS 400 (UCF20) debuted in November 1994 (for the 1995 model year) with a longer wheelbase and similar specifications as the original model. The public unveiling of the vehicle occurred in a gala ceremony held at the San Francisco Opera House in California. Internally, over 90% of the redesigned LS 400's composition was new or redesigned, with increased sound insulation, a strengthened body structure, suspension updates (first LS/Celsior with Skyhook adaptive computerized air suspension), and improved brakes. The redesigned model was  lighter than its predecessor and achieved slightly better fuel economy. The 0– time improved to 7.5 seconds.

Development of the second-generation LS 400 began after worldwide launch of the first generation under program code 250T. Given the first-generation model's successful reception and high level of customer satisfaction with its design, replicating the original LS 400's attributes with its successor was one of chief engineer Kazuo Okamoto's primary goals (he stated that "a tradition cannot be founded if you reject the first generation"). However, as the overall length remained the same, trunk capacity was slightly reduced. The more aerodynamic body (Cd 0.28) retained the general profile and contours of the original LS 400 and was the work of the Calty Design Research center in the U.S. Designers had evaluated 20 competing concepts, including several with a radically changed body, before selecting a winning entry in 1991 that included forms and contours similar to the original LS 400. Upon final approval in 1992, an evolutionary redesign was the ultimate result, with new design features consisting of sharper angles, curved body lines, and a beveled grille. More prominent side lines provided a reference point for parking maneuvers, and forward visibility was improved. Production development lasted from 1991 until conclusion in the second quarter of 1994. Design patents were filed at the Japan Patent Office on October 14, 1992 under registration number 732548, using a prototype.

The redesigned LS 400 interior received upgraded features, varying from dual-zone climate controls to rear cupholders. A newly patented seat cushion design, similar to the car's suspension, used lightweight internal coil springs and stabilizer bars to improve comfort. One of the first in-dash CD changers was offered as an option. Safety enhancements included enlarged crumple zones, three-point seat belts at all positions, and a new collapsible steering column. In Japan, the Toyota Celsior equivalents were offered in the same "A", "B", and top-spec "C" configurations as before, along with an additional selection of exterior colors. Several optional features, such as a compact disc-based Global Positioning System (GPS) navigation system and reclining rear seats, were available only in Japan.

At its U.S. debut, the redesigned LS 400 retained a pricing advantage over European competitors in its largest market, launching with a base price of US$51,000. However, cost differences had narrowed following more aggressive pricing and added feature content from rival manufacturers. To promote their new flagship, Lexus launched a US$50 million advertising campaign, the most expensive marketing effort since the launch of the division. In mid-1995, sales slowed as the U.S. government threatened tariffs on Japanese luxury cars over the widening U.S.-Japan trade deficit, potentially raising the price of a fully optioned LS 400 to over US$100,000. Subsequent negotiations averted the sanctions by the second quarter of that year, and sales recovered in the following months. Ultimately, second-generation LS 400 sales were lower than the original model; production totaled approximately 114,000 units.

Production of the UCF20 ran from October 1994 to July 1997. For 1997, a limited "Coach Edition" LS 400 was produced in partnership with American leather manufacturer Coach Inc. The edition featured Coach leather seats; embroidered emblems on the exterior, floormats, and armrest; special colors and added trim; and a Coach cabin bag. Production was limited to a yearly run of 2,500 units.

1997–2000 

Designed through early 1996, in September 1997 a revised LS 400 was introduced for the 1998 model year. Acceleration times and fuel economy were improved as a result. The suspension and steering also received minor tweaks to improve feel and handling. Stylistically, the vehicle sported a new front fascia, side mirrors, and updated wheels; a rear window diversity antenna replaced the conventional power mast. The cabin received upgrades, including a trip computer, HomeLink, retractable rear headrests, reading lamps, and ultraviolet-tinted glass, while the climate control gained a micron filtration feature with a smog sensor.

In August 1997, the first production laser adaptive cruise control on a Toyota vehicle was introduced on the Celsior version (Japan only). It controlled speed only through throttle control and downshifting, but did not apply the brakes. Because of laser technology limitations, it deactivated in bad weather.

A CD-ROM-based GPS automotive navigation system became an option in the U.S. Added safety features included front side airbags, vehicle stability control and in 2000, brake assist. Low beam HID headlamps were introduced as well. The headlights were also equipped with a programmable delay feature for proximity illumination. In February 2000, the limited "Platinum Series" LS 400 was introduced at the Chicago Auto Show in partnership with American Express. The edition featured most luxury options as standard, along with separate exterior colors, wheels, badging, and two years' no-fee use of an American Express Platinum Card.

Third generation (XF30; 2000)

2000–2003 

The third-generation Lexus LS 430 (UCF30) debuted at the North American International Auto Show in January 2000 as a 2001 model, introducing a new body design with a host of new interior and technological features. The interior design was inspired by luxury hotels (Imperial Hotel, Four Seasons Hotel, The Ritz-Carlton) and the seats were inspired by the first class seats of British Airways and Japan Airlines.

It was the first US market Lexus with adaptive cruise control (called Dynamic Laser Cruise Control). It employed a lidar sensor and (unlike the laser ACC introduced in 1997 on the Celsior) was able to activate brakes for deceleration. However, because of laser technology limitations, it would deactivate in bad weather.

The LS 430 was one of the first gasoline V8 vehicles to be certified as an Ultra Low Emissions Vehicle (ULEV). The standard suspension had been completely redesigned, with a double-wishbone setup at all four wheels; a tuned suspension was offered for the first time. A new torque-activated electronic control unit made throttle adjustments based on vehicle speed, engine revolutions per minute, and pedal position. The LS 430 sported a 0– acceleration time of 6.7 seconds. Sales began in October 2000 in the United States.

Heading into the planning of the LS 430, division executives concluded that the previous LS redesign had been too restrained in its approach. The LS 430 development team, led by chief engineer Yasushi Tanaka, accordingly opted for a more thorough exterior, interior, and technological redevelopment. The development of the LS 430 took four years. Selected from 16 different concept designs, the resulting vehicle of December 1997—when the final design (by Akihiro Nagaya) was approved—saw the sedan's dimensions increase in terms of wheelbase and height. The exterior featured a larger grille with rounded edges, quarter windows on the rear doors, and rounded trapezoidal headlamps. The body was also more aerodynamic than previous LS sedans (Cd 0.26; 0.25 with air suspension), and was the product of wind tunnel testing at facilities used for Shinkansen bullet train development. A  wheelbase stretch resulted in more interior volume and allowed the engine to be positioned further aft for better balance. Trunk space was increased by one-third due to repositioning of the fuel tank.

Compared to previous generations, the LS 430 featured a greater number of model configurations and options. While sharing the same body style, variants were differentiated by chassis configuration and onboard equipment. Models with the tuned sport suspension, sold as the "Touring" package in the United States, featured larger, high-speed brakes. These brakes were also standard on European market models. Fully optioned models with height adjustable air suspension, tuned for a combination of soft ride and responsive handling, were sold in the United States as the "Ultra Luxury" edition.

The LS 430 interior featured walnut wood trim on the dashboard and upper doors, along with semi-aniline leather and oscillating air conditioning vents.

The GPS navigation system was totally redesigned. A liquid crystal display with touchscreen on the upper center console served as interface. The system was the first LS with voice controlled navigation and the first luxury sedan to transition to DVD-based (instead of CD-ROM) maps.

Introduced a Mark Levinson premium sound system. In its highest trim specification, the LS 430 included Lexus Link telematics, power door and trunk closers, heated and cooled front seats, and power reclining massage rear seats equipped with audio controls, power sunshade, a cooler, and air purifier. Several rear seat features adopted for the LS 430 had been previously available in Japanese market luxury vehicles. Safety features added to the LS 430 included front and rear side curtain airbags, park sensors, rain-sensing windshield wipers, and electronic brakeforce distribution. The vehicle also gained water repellent windshield and side glass.

The LS 430 first went on sale in the United States with an initial base price of US$55,000, ranging up to US$70,000 when fully equipped. At the high end, the LS 430's pricing encroached on European rivals as Lexus became increasingly able to command higher price premiums for its vehicles. Sales for the LS 430 surpassed the previous generation, and production exceeded 140,000 units. The LS 430 was produced until July 2006, marking the last occasion the Lexus flagship was produced in a single body style. In Japan, the equivalent Toyota Celsior was also sold from August 2000 until March 2006, when the long-awaited introduction of Lexus Japan saw the arrival of new generation Lexus models. XF30 design patents were filed by Toyota in domestic Japan on 8 March 1999 at the Japan Patent Office under patent number 1080448.

In every year of production, the LS 430 was the most reliable luxury sedan in the J.D. Power and Associates Initial Quality Survey (with the early and late models of this series the best performing), and the highest recorded scorer in the history of J.D. Power's Vehicle Dependability Survey. Thatcham ratings data via the UK Motor Insurance Repair Research Centre listed the theft-prevention capabilities of the LS 430 as a maximum 5 stars, with the LS 430 being the first automobile to achieve the maximum theft-deterrence rating in 2001.

2003–2006 

Designed through early 2002, the LS 430 update launched in September 2003 as a 2004 model.

The first radar (instead of previous lidar) sensor on a Lexus sedan allowed the new Dynamic RADAR Cruise Control to work in any weather conditions. The millimeter-wave radar technology also enabled the first Pre-Collision System (PCS) on a Lexus sedan (with partial autonomous braking only on the Japanese market Toyota Celsior version). A "low-speed tracking mode" was added in 2004. The low-speed tracking mode was a second mode that would warn the driver if the car ahead stopped and provide braking; it could stop the car but then deactivated.

Introduced a new six-speed automatic transmission and revised styling. The powerplant remained the same as before. Exterior changes included restyled front and rear fascias, light-emitting diode (LED) taillights, and different wheels.

It debuted the first Lexus high-intensity discharge headlights for the high beam (Bi-Xenon), and also the first AFS adaptive curve headlights, which swiveled the projector headlamps in the direction of vehicle turns.

The interior received knee airbags, lighted rear-seat vanity mirrors, and new trim selections, including bird's eye maple wood. New options included an updated navigation system, Bluetooth and a backup camera. A driver-programmable electronic key feature allowed the vehicle to detect the key fob in the owner's pocket and unlock the doors by touch.

Fourth generation (XF40; 2006)

2006–2009 

Development on fourth generation LS began in 2001 under program code "250L", with the design process being done under Yo Hiruta from 2002 to late 2003, with the final production design being frozen in 2004. In October 2005, Lexus premiered a gasoline-electric hybrid concept car, the LF-Sh (Lexus Future-Sedan hybrid), at the Tokyo Motor Show, publicly previewing the next Lexus flagship with a concept version for the first time. Introduced at the January 2006 North American International Auto Show for the 2007 model year, the fourth-generation Lexus LS became the first Lexus model to be produced in both standard and long-wheelbase versions. Using an all-new platform, the LS 460 (USF40) uses the standard  wheelbase, while the LS 460 L (USF41) features a stretched  wheelbase. The fourth-generation models' technical specifications were shown in greater detail at the Geneva Motor Show in February 2006. A hybrid version, LS 600h L (UVF46), was previewed at the New York International Auto Show in April 2006. At its introduction in 2006, it won the Car of the Year Japan award for the second time.

Acceleration from 0– is listed at 5.7 seconds.

The development of the LS 460 and its variants, led by chief engineer Moritaka Yoshida, began as Lexus was shifting its design strategy towards a more diversified product lineup, with new-vehicle launches largely focused on global markets. Plans called for the next-generation LS to differentiate itself further beyond previous models in terms of design and technology. A "Super LS" model, priced above the US$100,000 ultra-luxury category, was also considered. Externally, the Lexus LS received the styling cues of Lexus' new design direction, called L-finesse. First shown on the LF-Sh concept, the vehicle gained body forms running the length of the car, wheel arches, arrow-shaped chrome trim, a lower-set grille, and crystalline adaptive headlamps.

The LS 460 interior gained a push-button start, thin-film transistor instrument display, and numerous luxury options, ranging from a hard disk drive-based GPS navigation system and song library to a heated steering wheel and XM NavTraffic. Standard equipment included power 16-way driver and 12-way front passenger seats with lumbar adjustment and seat heaters, leather upholstery, premium sound system, power moonroof, and trunk pass-through. The climate control offered the first infrared body temperature sensors in an automobile; it also featured ceiling air diffusers. An "Executive" seating package on the LS 460 L included a rear-seat DVD entertainment system, swivel tray table, and a shiatsu massaging ottoman seat.

It was the first LS with continuous controlled Adaptive Variable Suspension (AVS). The addition of an automated parallel parking assist feature, the first of its kind in the U.S., allowed the LS 460 to steer itself into preselected parking spaces. Other drive-assist features included a brake-hold system, radar cruise control, electric variable gear ratio power steering, and electronically controlled braking. The new stability control system was improved to anticipate skids and alter steering assist and gear ratios. The suite of new safety features extended from an eye-tracking Driver Monitoring System to a lane departure warning system. The pre-collision system added the first production image processing chip in a car capable of identifying vehicles and pedestrians in real time, along with millimeter-wavelength radar, stereo cameras, and infrared night vision projectors. A rear pre-collision system with whiplash-preventing active seat headrests and dual-chamber front airbags was also introduced.

The LS 460 and LS 460 L arrived at dealerships in Japan, the U.S., and Europe in late 2006, and the vehicle reached Australia, East Asia, and the Middle East in 2007. The U.S. base prices for the 2007 LS 460 and LS 460 L were US$61,000 and US$71,000, respectively. In 2006 and 2007, the average price paid for U.S. market LS 460 L sedans exceeded US$80,000, due largely to added options packages, placing the Lexus LS in the same average price range as its long-wheelbase Audi, BMW, and Jaguar rivals for the first time.

After debuting a hybrid powertrain with the 2005 LF-Sh concept, Lexus began sales of the LS 600h L (UVF46), the first production V8-powered full-hybrid vehicle, in May 2007 for the 2008 model year. The long-wheelbase LS 600h L is equipped with Lexus Hybrid Drive, featuring a 5.0-liter 2UR-FSE V8 engine mated to a high-output electric motor with nickel-metal hydride battery packs. Fuel economy is slightly higher overall than the lower-powered non-hybrid LS, and the hybrids achieve a U.S. Super Ultra Low Emission Vehicle (SULEV) rating. Features specific to the LS hybrids include the first production low beam LED headlights, a leather-trimmed dash, and blue-tinted hybrid badging. In April 2007, Lexus announced that the base price for the LS 600h L would be over US$104,000, surpassing the V12-equipped Toyota Century as the most expensive Japanese luxury car ever produced. A standard-wheelbase version destined for Asia and Europe, the LS 600h (UVF45), was launched in Japan in May 2007. The first 100 LS 600h L sedans sold in the U.S. were offered as "Launch Edition" models via the Neiman Marcus catalog for InCircle members.

In 2008, all-wheel drive versions of the non-hybrid LS 460 (USF45) and LS 460 L (USF46) models premiered at the Moscow International Automobile Salon. Debuting at the 2008 Pebble Beach Concours d'Elegance, the LS 600h L "Pebble Beach Edition", limited to 50 units, was produced in partnership with the Pebble Beach Company. A specialized Lexus LS 460 was installed as a driving simulator at Toyota's Higashifuji Technical Center, in Shizuoka, Japan, for automotive safety testing, and in 2009 at Tokyo's Intelligent Transport Systems (ITS-Safety) exhibition, the LS 460 ITS-Safety concept was unveiled showing road-to-vehicle and vehicle-to-vehicle information-exchange technologies.

2009–2012 
Debuting in late 2009 for the 2010 model year, the revised LS 460 and LS 460 L included restyled front and rear fascias, side mirror turn signals, and new wheel designs. New technology included automatic high beam lights, a self-repairing clear coat for the exterior paint, and an optional pre-crash detection system. The standard cabin received additional chrome trim, an optional DVD entertainment system behind the center armrest, and in certain markets, an all-digital instrument panel with night vision capability. The LS 460 Sport—a performance variant equipped with a sport-tuned air suspension, Brembo brakes, forged wheels, paddle shifters, body kit, and a unique interior—was made available for the short-wheelbase rear-wheel drive configuration. The Sport model received the Sport Direct Shift transmission, also found in the Lexus IS F, with downshift rev-matching capability and manual mode. A new interior customization program, "L-Select", also became available for LS customers in Japan.

2012–2017 
Lexus released an official photograph of its restyled XF40 series in July 2012. The substantial update incorporates the new Lexus corporate fascia, comprising the "spindle" grill and consequently sees the fitment of a redesigned hood, reshaped front fenders and headlamps, plus a new bumper. These styling revisions see the retention of the side profile and doors, including rear fenders. Thus, the newly designed tail-lamps, trunk lid, and rear bumper are only partially modified. For the first time, an F-Sport variant is being offered. 'Nanoe'  technology is used in the air conditioning system where 20–50 nm ions are bonded to water molecules.

Fifth generation (XF50; 2017)

2017–2020 

Developed under the 200B program, the fifth-generation LS made its debut at the January 2017 North American International Auto Show. This model was previewed by the LF-FC concept that was first shown at the 2015 Tokyo Motor Show. It is the second Lexus model to be built on GA-L platform, after the LC grand tourer. Dubbed as LS 500 (VXFA50/55), it is the first LS to be powered by a V6 engine. The wheelbase is  longer than the previous long-wheelbase model, the LS 460L. The height is also  lower, with the bonnet and boot measuring  lower, respectively.

In a couple of Lexus firsts, the fifth-generation LS is the first Lexus sedan to feature a six-sided window design, while the flush-surface windows integrate smoothly with the pillars. In the company's efforts to reconcile two conflicting goals, sufficient headroom with a low roofline, the new LS employs an available outer-slide-type panoramic moonroof instead of the conventional, internally retracting item.

The fifth-generation LS also features 3D-surround Mark Levinson audio with in-ceiling array speakers. The next-generation, remote touch infotainment interface called Lexus Enform, is said to be designed to mimic smartphone operation, with support for handwritten input. Alongside the 12.3 inch navigation display, the fifth-generation LS can be specified with an optional 24 inch, colour HUD for the driver's view. The fifth-generation LS was launched in Japan on December 18, 2017 and globally in the first quarter of 2018.

The LS 500h (GVF50/55) uses the Multi Stage Hybrid System that debuted in the LC 500h. Like the LC 500h, it uses a lithium-ion battery rather than the nickel-metal hydride (NiMH) battery used in the previous LS 600h.

Lexus Safety System+ 2.0 is fitted as standard to the LS. The available Advanced Safety Package introduced Lexus CoDrive, which help actively steer the vehicle should it detect a pedestrian.

2020–present 

The fifth-generation LS received a facelift in 2020 for the 2021 model year. Notable improvements have been made in several areas of the vehicle. The suspension received enhancements that improves ride quality, handling and ingress/egress of the vehicle. The LS 500's 3.4-liter V6 engine has an updated piston design aimed to lower emissions and reduce NVH when the engine is cold while the hybrid variant received several hardware and software upgrades improving the acceleration of the vehicle. The interior of the LS has been further refined with revised seats, touch points, higher-resolution rearview mirror and updated leather options. The facelifted LS uses a 12.3-inch touchscreen infotainment system instead of the mouse-based implementation found in prior model years. Apple CarPlay, Android Auto and Amazon Alexa integration are standard equipment. All grades of the 2021 LS are equipped with Lexus Safety System+ 2.0 as standard and received a number of updates such as Lane Change Assist and Active Steering Assist. Exterior updates include a revised front fascia, radiator intake, headlights, taillights and updated color options.

In Europe, the updated LS 500h was launched a few months later and the LS 500 was dropped.

An update launched on 8 April 2021 includes the Advanced Drive including driver monitor camera and remote software updates. 
It is able to keep the vehicle in its lane, maintain the distance from other vehicles, navigate a lane split, change lanes, and overtake other vehicles. It also has Advanced Park, an advanced parking assistance system.

Manufacturing 

The Lexus LS has been consistently produced on dedicated Lexus assembly lines at Toyota's flagship Tahara factory, located in the city of Tahara, in Aichi Prefecture, Chūbu region, southwest of Nagoya, since 1989. Tahara remains the sole production site, having inaugurated its new line number four specifically for assembly of the original LS 400.

For the Lexus LS, the Tahara plant developed new molds and enhanced assembly techniques and instituted measures aimed at increasing the precision of the sedan's fit and finish. The 1989 LS 400 became the first production automobile to receive extensive laser welding, allowing for seamless steel welds. A large sheet metal press was developed to reduce or eliminate panel gaps by stamping large sections whole instead of singly. Separately installed parts, such as exterior lights, were also spring-loaded for a tighter fit. When production switched to the LS 460, the number of laser welds was doubled.

Despite Tahara's large-scale automation, Lexus LS production also involves specialized personnel who are tasked with key production points, such as testing each vehicle's V8 engine via dynamometer and stethoscope for calibration before installation. With the LS 460, a hand-sanded paint process was introduced. The production standards used on the Lexus LS were eventually adopted by the manufacturer for other vehicles; in 2007, the assembly of Toyota Corolla economy cars used the same panel gap measurements as the LS 400 did eighteen years earlier.

Industrial significance 

The Lexus LS marked a successful entrant of a Japanese manufacturer into the prestige luxury arena, after the first Honda (Acura) Legend, a market that had long been dominated by established European and American brands. By 1991, with the LS 400 its top-selling model, Lexus had overtaken Mercedes-Benz and BMW in overall U.S. sales, and in 2000, the marque passed Cadillac as the luxury sales leader in the largest automotive market. Rival manufacturers responded with lower prices and added features. In particular, Mercedes-Benz reorganized its operations, shifting to a targeted-cost process similar to Lexus production methods, and dropped competing U.S. base prices by nearly 10 percent. To rival the LS 400, extra features were rushed for the launch of the 1991 Mercedes-Benz S-Class (W140), causing budget overruns and costing the job of Daimler-Benz's chief engineer, Wolfgang Peter. Approximately 5 percent of 1989 LS 400 sales went to buyers employed by rival manufacturers, including GM, Ford, and Chrysler. When the LS 400 was disassembled for engineering analysis, Cadillac engineers concluded that the vehicle could not be built using existing GM methods. Industry publications noted the LS 400's precise panel gaps, and the subject became a common evaluation standard in road tests. The LS 430's interior noise level was later used by rival makes as a measure of cabin quietness.

According to industry observers, the introduction of the Lexus LS reshaped Toyota's image from that of an "econobox" manufacturer to the builder of an automotive standard bearer. This stood in contrast to the predictions of early detractors, including rival manufacturers who dismissed Toyota as incapable of producing a competitive luxury vehicle. Japanese contemporaries from the luxury divisions of Honda (Acura) and Nissan (Infiniti) had differing degrees of success. Honda had entered into a joint venture with Britain's Austin Rover Group in November 1981, launching Project XX with an Austin Rover–Honda XX letter of intent to replace the Rover SD1 with the Rover 800 and to provide a midsize, V6-powered luxury sedan for Honda, called the Honda Legend. Marketed as the Acura Legend in the U.S., the sedan initially sold well, but subsequent models (renamed Acura RL) performed below sales expectations. Launched by Nissan in December 1989, the V8-powered Infiniti Q45 closely rivaled the LS 400 in specifications and price, but was unsuccessful in sales (attributed to unconventional styling and marketing), leading to its discontinuation in 2006. The success of the Lexus LS became a test case for mainstream manufacturers targeting upscale segments. By investing in a separate marque, Toyota was able to avoid the stigma attached to a mass-market brand's charging premium prices. The effect of the LS 400 on the automotive industry led Automobile magazine to add the sedan to its "24 Most Important Vehicles of the 20th Century" list in 1996.

Sales and production 
In its largest market, the U.S., the Lexus LS was the top-selling flagship luxury sedan for 15 of the first 17 years following its debut. In Japan, the next-largest market for the Lexus LS, the introduction of the 2007 LS 460 attracted 12,000 pre-orders, and the Lexus LS has gone on to sell successfully in its class. Following the introduction of the LS 460 and Lexus' expanded global launch in 2007, sales of the Lexus flagship have increasingly come from outside the brand's traditional U.S. strongholds. By 2007, the Lexus LS ranked second globally in flagship sales, next to the Mercedes-Benz S-Class' 85,500 units, with 71,760 Lexus LS sedans sold worldwide, and over half the total coming from outside the U.S. market. In 2008, U.S. sales fell 42% amidst the late-2000s recession, mirroring the overall decline of the luxury car market.

The Lexus LS has not sold as well in Europe, where Lexus suffers from smaller brand recognition, image, and a less-developed dealership network. In European markets, the Lexus LS has ranked behind Jaguar, Mercedes-Benz, Audi, and BMW in flagship luxury car sales. Automotive analysts have suggested a possible rationale for the sales disparity, in that European buyers place less emphasis on vehicle reliability and have more brand loyalty to established domestic marques. In contrast, the Lexus LS has ranked second in sales to the Mercedes-Benz S-Class (and ahead of rivals from BMW, Audi, and Jaguar) in markets outside Europe, such as South Africa.

Technical specifications

Awards 
Notable examples of awards received by the Lexus LS include (2007) World Car of the Year, International Car of the Year, (1991) Canadian Car of the Year, Wheels Car of the Year, and Top Gear Limousine of the Year. The Lexus LS has been the highest-rated luxury car in Automobile Magazine, Car and Driver, Consumer Reports, Fleet World, and MotorWeek. In J.D. Power's long-term Vehicle Dependability Study, the Lexus LS has been the most reliable car for fifteen consecutive years, the most for any manufacturer, and Consumer Reports has ranked the sedan as the most reliable vehicle tested. Safety awards include Auto Bilds 2007 Innovation Prize for the LS 460 pre-collision system, consecutive first place rankings in the What Car? Security Supertest, and Kiplinger's "Best in Safety for Cars $40,000 and Over". Technical honors range from Ward's 10 Best Engines, to Edmunds.com's "Best Sound System in Cars Over $30,000".

In U.S. consumer publications, Lexus' flagship model is recognized as one of the most reliable vehicles ever built, having held the top ranking in J.D. Power and Associates' U.S. Vehicle Dependability Survey for fifteen consecutive years (1994–2009), again in 2012, third place in 2013, and top again in 2014. A 1996 Lexus LS400 owned by an automotive journalist has surpassed a million miles on what is believed to be its original engine.

References

Bibliography 
 
 
 
 
 
 *

External links 

 

LS
Cars introduced in 1989
1990s cars
2000s cars
2010s cars
2020s cars
Full-size vehicles
Luxury vehicles
Sedans
Limousines
First car made by manufacturer
Rear-wheel-drive vehicles
All-wheel-drive vehicles
Flagship vehicles
Hybrid electric cars
Partial zero-emissions vehicles